Huhtanen is a Finnish surname. Notable people with the surname include:

 Miika Huhtanen (born 1993), Finnish ice hockey player
 Tuomas Huhtanen (born 1987), Finnish ice hockey player
 Veikko Huhtanen (1919–1976), Finnish gymnast

Surnames of Finnish origin
Finnish-language surnames